Ward is a home rule municipality in Boulder County, Colorado, United States. The population was 150 at the 2010 census. The town is a former mining settlement founded in 1860 in the wake of the discovery of gold at nearby Gold Hill.

History

The town was named for Calvin Ward, who prospected a claim in 1860 on the site known as Miser's Dream. The town boomed the following year with the discovery by Cyrus W. Deardorff of the Columbia vein. Over the next several decades the population fluctuated, growing from several hundred to several thousand before declining once again. The mines in the area remained profitable for many decades, with one mine eventually producing over 2 million ounces (62 metric tons) of silver. A post office with the name Ward District was established January 13, 1863; the name was changed to Ward, September 11, 1894. The city was incorporated in June 1896. In January 1900 over 50 buildings were destroyed by a devastating fire, although the profitability of the mines led to the immediate rebuilding of the town. The town was largely deserted by the 1920s, but the construction of the Peak-to-Peak Highway in the 1930s led to a revival of the town. During WWII the town's year-round population dropped to four people. Then, in the 1960s, the town's population jumped from between 10-20 year-round residents to well over 100 due to the town's interest to hippies.

The town has several businesses along its main street, including a restaurant, a coffee shop, an art gallery, and general store.

Geography

Ward is located at  (40.072347, -105.510131).

Demographics

As of the census of 2010, there were 150 people, 75 households, and 36 families residing in the town. The racial makeup of the town was 98.82% White, and 1.18% from two or more races.

There were 75 households, out of which 26.7% had children under the age of 18 living with them, 34.7% were married couples living together, 5.3% had a female householder with no husband present, and 52% were non-families. 37.3% of all households were made up of individuals, and 8% had someone living alone who was 65 years of age or older. The average household size was 2 and the average family size was 2.67.

The age of the town's populace was spread out, with 19.3% under the age of 18, 5.3% from 18 to 24, 32% from 25 to 44, 35.3% from 45 to 64, and 8% who were 65 years of age or older. The median age was 43.5 years. For every 100 females, there were 154.2 males. For every 100 females age 18 and over, there were 132.7 males.

In 2000, the median income for a household in the town was $33,750, and the median income for a family was $50,313. Males had a median income of $26,250 versus $28,750 for females. The per capita income for the town was $14,900. None of the population or families were below the poverty line.

Notable people
Hazel Schmoll, botanist

See also

Outline of Colorado
Index of Colorado-related articles
State of Colorado
Colorado cities and towns
Colorado municipalities
Colorado counties
Boulder County, Colorado
List of statistical areas in Colorado
Front Range Urban Corridor
North Central Colorado Urban Area
Denver-Aurora-Boulder, CO Combined Statistical Area
Boulder, CO Metropolitan Statistical Area
Roosevelt National Forest
2013 Colorado floods

References

External links
Town contacts 
CDOT map of Ward
Ward, Colorado: a slice of Appalachia in the Rockies
Ghosttowns.com: Ward, Colorado
Ward, Colorado, a revitalized gold-mining ghost town

Towns in Colorado
Towns in Boulder County, Colorado